The 2012–13 SC Paderborn 07 season is the 28th season in the club's football history. In 2012–13, the club plays in the 2. Bundesliga, the second tier of German football. It is the club's fourth consecutive season in this league, having played at this level since 2009–10, after it was promoted from the 3. Liga in 2009.

The club also took part in the 2012–13 edition of the DFB-Pokal, the German Cup, but was knocked out in the first round by third division side Arminia Bielefeld.

The club finished the season in 12th place to secure a spot in the following year's 2. Bundesliga.

Squad

Transfers

In

Loans in

Out

Friendly matches

Competitions

2. Bundesliga

League table

Results summary

Matches

DFB Pokal

Sources

External links
 2012–13 SC Paderborn 07 season at Weltfussball.de 
 2012–13 SC Paderborn 07 season at kicker.de 
 2012–13 SC Paderborn 07 season at Fussballdaten.de 

Paderborn
SC Paderborn 07 seasons